René Million (23 March 1934 – 14 December 2013) was a French swimmer. He competed in the men's 400 metre freestyle at the 1952 Summer Olympics.

References

External links
 

1934 births
2013 deaths
Olympic swimmers of France
Swimmers at the 1952 Summer Olympics
Place of birth missing
French male freestyle swimmers